Callowhill Depot is a bus and trolley barn operated by the Southeastern Pennsylvania Transportation Authority (SEPTA), located in West Philadelphia, near the Delaware County border. It was built in 1913 by the Philadelphia Rapid Transit Company (PRT) and was later operated by the Philadelphia Transportation Company (PTC) before being taken over by SEPTA. The depot was constructed as part of the Thomas E. Mitten modernization program. Since its construction, the depot has suffered fire damage and reconstruction in 1949, 1950, and 1995.

The Callowhill Depot is located in the heart of West Philadelphia, located on the southwest corner of the 5900 block of Callowhill Street with the bus and trolley bays across the street. The depot is surrounded by 59th, Vine, 58th, and Callowhill Streets. Callowhill Depot was an all-trolley depot until May 28, 1955, when Route 70 (52nd Street Line) was converted to bus operation. Callowhill Depot was the base of all streetcar routes that operated in West Philadelphia, until National City Lines converted most of them to buses.

The depot is accessible only to SEPTA employees, however, transit enthusiasts often photograph streetcars pulling in and out. For safety reasons, SEPTA Transit Police will stop and question anyone found on the property without reason or authorization.

Routes
Callowhill Depot is home to two SEPTA trolley routes and 11 bus routes. The depot's trolley bays are 2, 3 and 4. Bay 2 is the rail shop, bay 3 is used by Route 10, and bay 4 is used by Route 15. These routes all operate in West Philadelphia, with their eastern terminus being either in downtown Center City Philadelphia or North Philadelphia.

Routes operated include:
Route 10  Overbrook to Center City via Lancaster Avenue and Subway-Surface Tunnel
Route 15  Port Richmond & Northern Liberties to Haddington via Girard Avenue and Richmond Street
Route 21  69th Street Transportation Center to Penn's Landing via Chestnut and Walnut Streets
Route 30  69th Street Transportation Center to 30th Street Station (30th & Market Streets) via Haverford Avenue
Route 31  Overbrook Park to Center City via Market Street
Route 38  Wissahickon Transportation Center to Center City via Belmont Avenue, Market and Chestnut Streets
Route 40  West Park/Wynnefield to Society Hill via 40th, 41st, Lombard and South Streets (Monday - Thursday) and eastbound on Pine Street (weekends only)
Route 42  Wycombe & West Philadelphia to Penn's Landing via Spruce, Chestnut and Walnut Streets
Route 43  Parkside to Northern Liberties/Port Richmond via Spring Garden Street and Columbus Boulevard
Route 44  Ardmore/Gladwyne to Center City via Montgomery Avenue, City Avenue, Schuylkill Expressway and Market Street
Route 46  Overbrook to Angora via 60th Street
Route 52  Gladwyne/Wynnefield to Southwest Philadelphia vis 52nd and 54th Streets
Route 65  69th Street Transportation Center to Germantown/Mount Airy via City Line Avenue and Walnut Lane. This route was formerly shared with the Allegheny Depot.

External links
Philadelphia Trolley Tracks:Girard Avenue Light Rail Progress - August 8-9, 2001 Photos (PhillyTrolley.org)
SEPTA Route 15 images (WorldNYCSubway.org)
The New PCC II Cars For Girard Avenue SEPTA Route 15 (September 4, 2005)
Philadelphia NRHS
SEPTA Bus Roster (Philadelphia Transit Vehicles) 

Railway stations in the United States opened in 1913
Transportation buildings and structures in Philadelphia
SEPTA stations and terminals
1913 establishments in Pennsylvania